Lee Jung-Won  (born 27 July 1989) is a South Korean former footballer who played as full back for Daejeon Citizen in the K-League.

On 17 June 2011, his football career was rescinded by the Korea Professional Football League with other accomplices.

References

External links 

1989 births
Living people
Association football defenders
South Korean footballers
Daejeon Hana Citizen FC players
K League 1 players
Sportspeople banned for life